The 1928–29 National Hurling League was the third edition of the National Hurling League, which ran from 21 October 1928 to 8 December 1929.

The twelve participating teams were Clare, Cork, Dublin, Galway, Kerry, Laois, Limerick, Meath, Offaly, Tipperary, Waterford and Wexford who were divided into an Eastern Division and a Southwestern Division. Each team played each of their rivals once with two points awarded for a win and one point awarded for a drawn game. The two teams who finished top of their respective divisions would play a final, with the winners being declared National Hurling League champions.

Dublin defeated Cork by 7-4 to 1-5 in the final.

National Hurling League

Eastern Division

Southwestern Division

Results

External links
 1928-29 National Hurling League results

References

National Hurling League seasons
League
League